Al-Arab Medical University (Romanised: Jamiaat Al-Arab Al-Tibiya) is a public university located in Benghazi, Libya, founded in 1984. The university includes the Faculties of Medicine, Pharmacy, Dentistry, and Public Health. located in Benghazi  Libya

References

 
Benghazi
Universities in Libya
Educational institutions established in 1984
Medical schools in Libya
1984 establishments in Libya